A by-election to the French National Assembly was held in Mayotte on 13 March 1977. The territory elected a single seat, taken by Younoussa Bamana of the Mahoré People's Movement, who was elected unopposed.

Results

References

Mayotte
Elections in Mayotte
1977 in Mayotte
By-elections to the National Assembly (France)
March 1977 events in Africa